Levi Samuel García (born 20 November 1997) is a Trinidadian professional footballer who plays as a Forward (association football) for Greek Super League club AEK Athens and the Trinidad and Tobago national team.

García began his professional football career in 2013, at the age of 15, with T&TEC in his native Trinidad and Tobago. After one season with the Electricity Boys, he completed a free transfer to fellow TT Pro League club Central FC. However, prior to making his first-team debut for the Couva Sharks, Garcia signed with AZ Alkmaar of the Eredivisie in February 2015. After spending two years in Israel, García moved to AEK Athens in 2020.

Considered one of the best footballers of the Greek league during his spell in Greece and able to play both as a winger and as a centre forward, García has been appraised for his muscle, his fitness, his dribbling, his tactical prowess and his exceptionally high jumping, having a playstyle described as similar to Cristiano Ronaldo.

Early life
García was born on 20 November 1997 in Santa Flora, Trinidad and Tobago to parents Carl and Judith, and comes from a football family consisting of three brothers (Daniel, Nathaniel, and Judah) who have represented different local clubs and two sisters (Carla and Adanna) who are also fans of the sport. In fact, the three brothers would play football in their backyard for hours when younger. In particular, García credits his early football influence to his eldest brother Daniel after he encouraged Levi to become a better player and rented a car or ordered a taxi to ensure that he attended youth training and matches.

At the age of 14, García attended Shiva Boys' Hindu College in Penal, Trinidad and also enrolled in the youth program at former TT Pro League club T&TEC. However, after one season with the Electricity Boys, the club suspended its football operations citing financial difficulties. Over the next two years, Garcia played alternatively for Shiva Boys' Hindu College and local youth club Siparia Spurs. In 2012, playing as a striker, García led Shiva Boys to the Secondary Schools Football League (SSFL) South Zone title and qualified as one of four schools for the FA Trophy. During the competition, Garcia scored one goal in three appearances to help the Shiva Boys progress in the competition before falling to Central FC in the quarterfinals.

Club career

Early career
After spending the previous year in the club's youth program, García made his full professional debut for T&TEC of the TT Pro League, at the age of 15, after making appearances during the club's run-in to close the 2012–13 season. Due to the club's severe financial struggles and inability to pay its salaried players, Electricity Boys manager Dexter Cyrus decided to feature some of its younger players, which included the three Garcia brothers, in Pro League matches.

In March 2014, García signed his first professional contract with Central FC of the TT Pro League on a two-year agreement. However, prior to his first appearance for the club, he was discovered in September 2014 while playing for Trinidad and Tobago during qualification for the 2015 CONCACAF U-20 Championship by Dutch agent Humphry Nijman. After an initial struggle between Central and Nijman, the two parties came to an agreement through mediation involving the Trinidad and Tobago Football Association to allow Garcia participate for a trial in the Netherlands.

AZ Alkmaar

On 20 February 2015, García signed a pre-contract agreement for three years with a club option for a two-year extension with AZ Alkmaar of the Eredivisie following a successful trial with the club. However, he was unable to begin his professional career until his eighteenth birthday due to existing European Union labour laws. After several months of difficult negotiations, Garcia's former club Central FC agreed upon an undisclosed transfer fee in June 2015 with AZ.

Rapid rise to the first team (2016–2018)
During the club's preparation for the 2015–16 season, García received training and special attention from former Dutch international Marco Van Basten who had served as an assistant manager for the club earlier in the year before stepping away for health reasons. On 24 January 2016, García made his professional and league debut for AZ Alkmaar against Feyenoord after coming on for Dabney dos Santos in the 68th minute with his club leading 4–1. Aged just 18 years and 65 days, García became the youngest Trinidadian footballer to make an appearance for a European club, beating a record previously held by former Aston Villa striker Dwight Yorke. One week later, he scored his first professional goal in less than a minute after coming on as a 71st-minute substitute in a 3–0 win over NEC Nijmegen to become the club's second youngest ever scorer. In his first season at AZ, García made eight league appearances and nine in all competitions having scored one league goal and recording one assist to help AZ finish fourth in the Eredivisie and qualify for the 2016–17 UEFA Europa League.

Jong AZ and Excelsior (2018)
After having played for Jong AZ for most of the first half of the 2017–18 season, struggling to make first team appearances, García was sent out on loan to S.B.V. Excelsior, another Eredivisie club, for the remainder of the season.

Ironi Kiryat Shmona
In May 2018, with his Alkmaar contract due to expire at the end of the season, it was announced García would join Israeli Premier League side Ironi Kiryat Shmona for the 2018–19 season.

Beitar Jerusalem
On 30 May 2019, García signed to Beitar Jerusalem.

AEK Athens
On 14 September 2020, AEK Athens signed the 22-year-old international by offering Beitar Jerusalem €2.6 million to acquire 60% of García's rights, plus bonuses. On 27 September 2020, he scored the opening goal of the 3–0 win of AEK Athens against Lamia on his league debut.

On 13 December 2020, García scored with a direct corner kick in a 4–3 away win against Apollon Smyrnis. On 14 January 2021, García scored with a direct free-kick to give his team a 1–0 away win against Aris Thessaloniki. On 20 January 2021, he came in off the bench and sealed a 2–0 home win against Apollon Smyrnis for the first leg of the Greek Cup round of 16.

On 28 February 2021, he scored in a 1–1 away draw against Panathinaikos.

His first two seasons in Greece weren't as productive as anticipated, but Matías Almeyda's appointment as the club's new coach at the start of 2022–23 season was crucial to his resurgence. Under the guidance of the Argentine, Levi transformed into a great striker, exploiting his speed and physical qualities. His adaptability and performances have been praised and as a result various clubs, including Villarreal, are keeping tabs on him, while AEK Athens are not willing to accept anything less than €15,000,000.

International career
García has represented Trinidad and Tobago on various levels of international competition, having been capped for the under-17, under-20, and the senior team.

Youth teams
He made his international debut for the under-17 team after replacing Brent Sam in the second half of their final match to help the Soca Warriors earn qualification for the 2013 CONCACAF U-17 Championship. During the continental tournament, he made two consecutive starts in a loss to Canada and in a 2–0 win against Costa Rica to advance to the knockout round. However, following a 4–2 loss to hosts Panama, the Soca Warriors fell one win short of qualifying for the 2013 FIFA U-17 World Cup.

In September 2014, García represented the under-20 team in central midfield en route to winning the 2014 Caribbean Under-20 Championship and qualifying for the 2015 CONCACAF U-20 Championship. Although he made four appearances during the CONCACAF Championship and impressed several European scouts, the Soca Warriors finished a disappointing fourth in their group with just one win and failed to qualify for the 2015 FIFA U-20 World Cup.

Senior team
García made his full international debut for the national team on 25 March 2016 against Saint Vincent and the Grenadines during qualification for the 2018 FIFA World Cup. García marked his national team debut with a pair of goals in the second half to lead the Soca Warriors to a 3–2 win. Garcia's goals made him Trinidad and Tobago's youngest ever scorer in a FIFA World Cup qualification match at 18 years and 127 days old. Two months later, he made an additional two appearances for the Soca Warriors in losses against Peru and Uruguay.

Career statistics

Club

International

Scores and results list Trinidad and Tobago's goal tally first.

Honours

ClubBeitar JerusalemIsraeli Toto Cup: 2019–20

InternationalTrinidad and Tobago U20'
CFU U-20 Tournament: 2014

Individual
 Youngest Trinidadian professional footballer in Europe: 18 years and 65 days
 Youngest Trinidadian professional goalscorer in Europe: 18 years and 71 days
 Youngest player to play for Trinidad and Tobago in a FIFA World Cup qualification match: 18 years and 127 days
 AEK Athens Player of the Year: 2020–21
Super League Greece Team of the Year : 2020–21

References

External links
Levi García at AZ Alkmaar

1997 births
Living people
Association football midfielders
Trinidad and Tobago footballers
Trinidad and Tobago international footballers
Trinidad and Tobago expatriate footballers
TT Pro League players
Eredivisie players
Israeli Premier League players
Super League Greece players
Central F.C. players
AZ Alkmaar players
Jong AZ players
Excelsior Rotterdam players
Hapoel Ironi Kiryat Shmona F.C. players
Beitar Jerusalem F.C. players
AEK Athens F.C. players
Expatriate footballers in the Netherlands
Expatriate footballers in Israel
Expatriate footballers in Greece
2015 CONCACAF U-20 Championship players
2019 CONCACAF Gold Cup players
Trinidad and Tobago under-20 international footballers
People from Siparia region